Münire Sultan ("brightness" or "brilliant"; 9 December 1844 – 29 June 1862) was an Ottoman princess, daughter of Sultan Abdulmejid I and one of his consorts Verdicenan Kadın.

Early life
Münire Sultan was born on 9 December 1844 at the Topkapı Palace. Her father was Sultan Abdulmejid I, and her mother was Verdicenan Kadın, the daughter of Prince Kaytuk Giorgi Achba and Princess Yelizaveta Hanım. She was the eldest child of her mother. She had a brother of Şehzade Ahmed Kemaleddin, three years younger than her, and an adoptive sister, Mediha Sultan.

First marriage

Engagement
In March 1854, a messenger from Istanbul announced the betrothal of Münire Sultan to Prince Ibrahim Ilhami Pasha, son of Abbas I of Egypt and his wife Mahivech Hanim. Large public celebrations were proclaimed and the viceroy was reported to be highly pleased with the news. Ibrahim Pasha sent her a solitaire ring, solitaire earrings and a briolette as her betrothal gifts. There were also all sorts of perfumes covered with transparent lids and bowls of musk and mastic. There were crystal carafes containing syrup and porcelain vases from Saxony holding all sorts of preserves, and finally there were both eastern and western candies on plates of Chinese porcelain. Her mother, Verdicenan Kadın gave some of these perfumes and morsels of food to other princesses, and also distributed them equally to the people in her entourage. The engagement took place in the Şemsipaşa Palace.

Wedding
The marriage took place on 17 May 1857 in at the Baltalimanı sahilhane, Istanbul. The wedding of her half-sister Cemile Sultan was also celebrated on the same day. The cost of the ceremony was bitterly criticized, because the Ottoman army had just suffered heavy defeats in Montenegro and Crete was in revolt. The marriage was consummated on 31 July 1857. The couple were given a palace located at Findiklı as their residence.

Second marriage
Münire was widowed at Prince Ibrahim al-Hamy death in 1860 when his boat capsized while crossing the Bosphorus, near Bebek Palace. On 2 January 1861, she married secondly a namesake of her first husband, Damat Ferik Ibrahim Pasha, son of Serasker Rıza Pasha. The couple had a son named Sultanzade Alaeddin Bey, born on 16 December 1861.

Death
Münire Sultan died at the age of seventeen at her palace located at Findiklı on 29 June 1862, and was buried in the mausoleum of Nakşidil Sultan, Fatih Mosque, Istanbul.

Issue

Ancestry

See also

List of Ottoman princesses
Muhammad Ali Dynasty family tree

References

Sources

1844 births
1862 deaths
Munire
19th-century Ottoman princesses